Governor Cranston may refer to:

John Cranston (governor) (1625–1680), Governor of the Colony of Rhode Island and Providence Plantations from 1678 to 1680
Samuel Cranston (1659–1727), Governor of the Colony of Rhode Island and Providence Plantations from 1698 to 1727